Kruiningen-Yerseke is a railway station in Zeeland in the south-west Netherlands. Located between Kruiningen and Yerseke on Nederlandse Spoorwegen's Roosendaal to Vlissingen line, the station was opened by the (privately operated but government-built) State Railways on 1 July 1868 and retains its original building from that date (enlarged in 1890 and 1902).

Train service
The station is served by trains running twice an hour in each direction on the Amsterdam – Haarlem – Leiden – The Hague – Rotterdam – Dordrecht – Roosendaal – Vlissingen intercity service.

Bus services
Connexxion bus services 594 (to and from Rilland) and 599 (to and from Wemeldinge) call at the station (daytime Mondays to Fridays only).

External links
NS website 
Dutch Public Transport journey planner 

Railway stations in Reimerswaal
Railway stations on the Staatslijn F
Railway stations opened in 1868